Sacha Jafri (born 1977 in United Kingdom) is a contemporary British artist known for creating the world's largest painting on canvas, Journey of Humanity (as recognised by Guinness World Records) over seven months in 2020 during the COVID-19 pandemic in Dubai.

Early life
Jafri attended Eton College. In 2000 he obtained his master's degree in Fine Arts from Oxford University.

Career
Jafri generally works outside the art gallery system, donates many of his works and or proceeds from them to charity efforts, and numbers among his collectors Barack Obama, members of the British royal family, Sir Richard Branson, Paul McCartney, Leonardo DiCaprio, Bill Gates, Madonna, David Beckham, George Clooney, and Eva Longoria.

Prince Charles commissioned Jafri to do portraits of the "14 most influential living Muslims" for his Mosaic initiative. He has also been appointed a resident artist by the 21st Century leaders charity. In 2014, he created the cover art for Silver Rails, the final studio album by musician Jack Bruce.

Journey of Humanity
In 2021, Jafri's Journey of Humanity painting sold at auction in Dubai for 228 million Dirham ($62 million US), the third highest auction price ever paid for a work of art by a living artist, behind Jeff Koons's Rabbit ($91.1 million US), and David Hockney's Portrait of an Artist (Pool with Two Figures) ($90 million US).

The artwork was purchased by French crypto businessman Andre Abdoune. Jafri donated the proceeds from the sale to children's charities.

References

British painters
Living people
1977 births
English contemporary artists